Arcangelisia is a genus of flowering plants belonging to the family Menispermaceae.

Its native range is Hainan to Indo-China and New Guinea.

Species:

Arcangelisia flava 
Arcangelisia gusanlung 
Arcangelisia tympanopoda

References

Menispermaceae
Menispermaceae genera